Durand, du Rand or du Randt is a surname of French origin. Notable people with the surname include:
 André Durand (born 1947), Canadian painter
 Angèle Durand (1925–2001), Belgian singer and actress
 Anthony Durand (1956–2009), American potter
 Alain Durand (born 1967), French footballer
 Asher Brown Durand (1796–1886), American painter
 Auguste Durand (1830–1909), French organist, publisher, and composer
 Bernice Durand (born 1942), American physicist
 Christophe Durand (born 1973), French table tennis player
 Claude Durand (1938–2015), French publisher, translator, and writer
 Cora Durand (1902–1998), American potter
 David Durand (1680–1763), Huguenot French and English minister and historian
 Dimitri Durand (born 1982), French footballer
 Earl Durand (1913–1939), American outlaw
 Edmé-Antoine Durand (1768–1835), French diplomat and art collector
 Elias Durand (1794–1873), American pharmacist and botanist
 Elias Judah Durand (1870–1922), American mycologist and botanist
 Estienne Durand (1586–1618), French poet
 Florentin Durand (born 1982), French ski jumper
 Frank Durand (1895–1978), American politician
 Frédérik Durand (born 1988), Canadian DJ
 George Du Rand (born 1982), South African swimmer
 George H. Durand (1838–1903), American politician
 Georges-Mathieu de Durand (died 1997), Canadian monk
 Gilbert Durand (1921–2012), French academic
 Gilles Durand (born 1952), Canadian former cyclist
 Ginette Durand (born 1929), French gymnast
 Godefroy Durand (1832–1896), French illustrator
 Grace Durand (1867–1948), American clubwoman, business owner, and temperance activist
 Gregory Durand (born 1977), French short track speed skater
 Guillaume Durand (1230–1296), French canonist and liturgist
 Hélène Durand (1883–1934), Belgian botanical illustrator
 Henry Marion Durand (1812–1871), British Indian Army officer and colonial administrator
 Sir Henry Mortimer Durand (1850–1924), British diplomat and civil servant in British India
 Henry R. Durand (1855–1932), businessman
 Henry Strong Durand (1861–1929), American medical doctor and philanthropist
 Hippolyte Durand (1801–1882), French architect
 Jacky Durand (born 1967), French professional cyclist
 Jacques Durand (1920–2009), French engineer and automobile designer
 Jacques Durand (publisher) (1865–1928), French music publisher and composer
 James Durand (1775–1833), businessman and political figure in Upper Canada
 Jean Durand (1882–1946), French screenwriter and film director
 Jean-Marie Durand (born 1940), French Assyriologist
 Jean-Nicolas-Louis Durand (1760–1834), French author, teacher and architect
 Jean-Philippe Durand (born 1960), French footballer
 Joël-François Durand (born 1954), French composer
 Johann Durand (born 1981), French football player
 John Durand (MP, died 1788) (1719–1788)
 John Hodsdon Durand (1761–1830)
 Julien Durand (disambiguation), several
 Kevin Durand (born 1974), Canadian actor
 Laurent Durand (1712–1763), French publisher
 Léopold Durand (1666–1746), French architect
 Lorenzo T. Durand (1849–1917), American lawyer and politician
 Manon Durand (born 1998), French canoeist
 Marguerite Durand (1864–1936), French stage actress, journalist, and suffragette
 Marie Durand (1711–1776), French Protestant
 Os du Randt (born 1972), South African rugby player
 Peter Durand (1766–1822), British inventor of the tin can
 Pierre Durand (disambiguation), several
 Raymond Durand (1786–1837), French diplomat
 Raymond Durand (driver) (born 1952), French rally driver
 Salty du Rand (1926–1979), South African rugby player
 Ursin Durand (1682–1771), French monk and historian
 William F. Durand (1859–1958), American aeronautical engineer

See also 
 Durant (surname)
 Durand (disambiguation)
 Randt

French-language surnames
Surnames from nicknames